Coöperatieve Inkoop Vereniging Superunie B.A. is a Dutch wholesale purchasing  cooperative among 14 supermarket companies. Several of these 14 represent multiple supermarket formulas (including brand licensing franchises). In total Superunie supplies about 1800 stores. Superunie has a Dutch marketshare of about 30%.

Superunie is part of European Marketing Distribution (EMD), a cooperative that has a European marketshare of about 14.8%.

Members
(as of June 2020)

Boni - 44 stores
MCD - 29 stores
Coop - 314 stores
Deen - 82 stores
DetailResult which includes:
DekaMarkt - 81 stores
Dirk - 123 stores (merge of Dirk van den Broek, Bas van der Heijden and Digros)
Hoogvliet - 51 stores
Jan Linders Supermarkten - 61 stores
Nettorama - 32 stores
Picnic - Online store
Poiesz - 69 stores
Sperwer Groep which includes:
PLUS - 270 stores
Spar - 445 stores
Sligro Food Group (Wholesale)
Vomar - 69 stores

Former members
Agrimarkt - 5 stores (taken over by Jumbo)
Jumbo - 283 stores
Golff (taken over by Spar, Poiesz and EMTÉ)
Sanders (taken over by EMTÉ and Sligro)
EMTÉ (member 1986-2019, taken over by Jumbo and Coop)

Brands 
Superunie offers several housebrands to its members: 
G'woon (Boni, Deen, Hoogvliet, Jan Linders, Coop, MCD Supermarkten and Vomar);
Plus (PLUS);
1 de Beste (Dirk and DekaMarkt);
Spar (Spar).

Members have the following Superunie brands in their stores:
First Choice Cola (cola)
Bonbébé (babyfood)
TopVit (dairy product)
Melkan (dairy product)
Bumblies (babycare)
Vismarine (fish)
Daily Chef (instant meal)
Schuttersbier (beer)
Bon Appetit (nuts, cheeses, salades)
Bakkers Weelde (cake)
Derlon (cosmetics)

External links 
 Superunie
 EMD

References 

Cooperatives in the Netherlands
Retailers' cooperatives
Companies based in Gelderland